The 1965 Israel Super Cup was the third Israel Super Cup, an annual Israeli football match played between the winners of the previous season's Top Division and Israel State Cup. As the match was not set by the Israel Football Association, it was considered an unofficial cup. The cup for this edition was donated by Ramat Gan Municipality.

The first match
The match finished 2–2 after 90 minutes, and was marred by a pitch invasion during the match half-time, with a considerable number of fans staying around the pitch during the second half, occasionally disrupting the match. In the match itself, Maccabi took the a 2–0 by the 48th minute and Hakoah equalized by scoring twice within the last 15 minutes of the match.

The second match
A replay wasn't set immediately, and was delayed as league matches started. Eventually, a friendly match was arrange for 30 April 1966, since the league went on a break as the national team played a friendly match and the Under-19 national team competed in the 1966 AFC Youth Championship. Only 800 spectators attended the match, which ended in a 1–1 draw.

Match details

Replay

References

1965
Super Cup
Super Cup 1965
Super Cup 1965
Israel Super Cup matches